Yellow House Canyon is about  long, heading in Lubbock, Texas, at the junction of Blackwater Draw and Yellow House Draw, and trending generally southeastward to the edge of the Llano Estacado about  east of Slaton, Texas; it forms one of three major canyons along the east side of the Llano Estacado and carries the waters of the North Fork Double Mountain Fork Brazos River.

Here, the city of Lubbock has constructed a series of small dams that form a series of narrow lakes, collectively known as Canyon Lakes. The Canyon Lakes  park offers conservation areas and recreational opportunities on the water and in the narrow park along the water's edge.

As Yellow House Canyon extends outside the city limits of Lubbock, the canyon gradually widens and deepens.  Around  to the east-southeast of Lubbock, a dam was constructed to form Buffalo Springs Lake, a recreational lake that now inundates the site of the main springs, though the springs continue to flow beneath the waters of the lake.  Immediately downstream of Buffalo Springs Lake is a much smaller dam that forms another recreational lake named Lake Ransom Canyon, where numerous single-family homes surround the lake to form the community of Ransom Canyon, Texas.

Downstream of Ransom Canyon, the North Fork is finally allowed to flow freely across sparsely populated ranchland as the canyon continues to deepen and widen. Further downstream, near the confluence of Plum Creek and the North Fork, the walls of the canyon begin to curve sharply outward as the North Fork Double Mountain Fork Brazos River flows out of the canyon and onto the rolling plains of West Texas.

See also

Battle of Yellow House Canyon
Blanco Canyon
Canyon Valley, Texas
Caprock Canyons State Park and Trailway

Caprock Escarpment
Double Mountain Fork Brazos River
List of rivers of Texas
Palo Duro Canyon

Ransom Canyon
Robert R. Bruno Jr.
White River (Texas)
Yellow House Draw

References

External links

Mackenzie State Recreation Area

Robert Bruno Steel House

Canyons and gorges of Texas
Brazos River
Landforms of Lubbock County, Texas
Landforms of Crosby County, Texas
Llano Estacado